The TCIRG1 (T cell immune regulator 1) gene encodes for the V-type proton ATPase (V-ATPase) 116 kDa subunit a isoform 3 enzyme.

Gene  

TCIRG1 (T cell immune regulator 1) is a gene that encodes the V-type proton ATPase (V-ATPase) 116 kDa subunit a isoform 3 enzyme.

Function 

Through alternate splicing, the TCIRG1 gene encodes two protein isoforms with similarity to subunits of the vacuolar ATPase (V-ATPase) but the encoded proteins seem to have different functions. V-ATPase is a multisubunit enzyme that mediates acidification of eukaryotic intracellular organelles. V-ATPase dependent organelle acidification is necessary for such intracellular processes as protein sorting, zymogen activation, and receptor-mediated endocytosis. V-ATPase is composed of a cytosolic V1 domain and a transmembrane V0 domain.

The two isoforms are:
 long isoform a, also named OC116
 short isoform b, also named TIRC7 (N-terminus truncated, lacks amino acid residues 1-216 of the long isoform)

TIRC7 is expressed in T lymphocytes and is essential for normal T cell activation. This variant uses a transcription start site that is within exon 5 of variant 1 followed by an intron as part of its 5' UTR.

TIRC7 

TIRC7 is a 75 kDa membrane protein, first described in 1998, that plays a central role in T cell activation.

Expression 

TIRC7 is induced after immune activation on the cell surface of certain peripheral human T and B cells as well as monocytes and IL-10 expressing regulatory T cells. During immune activation, TIRC7 is co-localized with the T cell receptor and CTLA4 within the immune synapse of human T cells. At the protein and mRNA level, its expression is induced in lymphocytes in synovial tissues obtained from patients with rheumatoid arthritis or during rejection of solid organ transplants and bone marrow transplantation as well as in brain tissues obtained from patients with multiple sclerosis.

Function 

Antibody targeting of TIRC7 suppresses T cell activation and IL-2 secretion. Specifically, significant prevention of inflammation in a variety of animal models has been shown. These include rejection of transplanted kidney and heart allografts as well as progression of arthritis and experimental autoimmune encephalomyelitis (EAE). These effects were accompanied with significant decreases of Th1 specific cytokines e.g. IFN-gamma, TNF-alpha, IL-2 expression and transcription, induction of CTLA4 whereas IL-10 remained unchanged. The induction of TIRC7 in IL-10 secreting T regulatory cells and the prevention of colitis in the presence of TIRC7 positive T regulatory cells supports the inhibitory signals induced via TIRC7 pathway during immune activation. Further evidence for the inhibitory role of TIRC7 during the course of immune response is that prevention of colitis was achievable by a transfer of TIRC7 positive cells into CD45RO mice prior to induction of colitis. The negative immune regulatory role of TIRC7 is furthermore supported by the fact that TIRC7 knock out mice exhibits an increased T and B cell response in the presence of various stimuli in vitro and in vivo exhibiting. A significant induced memory cell subset and reduction of CTLA4 expression observed in TIRC7 knock out mice.

Ligand 

The cell surface ligand to TIRC7 is the non-polymorphic alpha 2 domain (HLA-DRα2) of HLA DR protein. Upon lymphocyte activation TIRC7 is upregulated to engage HLA-DRα2 and induce apoptotic signals in human CD4+ and CD8+ T-cells. The down-regulation of the immune response is achieved via activation of the intrinsic apoptotic pathway by caspase 9, inhibition of lymphocyte proliferation, SHP-1 recruitment, decrease in phosphorylation of STAT4, TCR-ζ chain and ZAP70 as well as inhibition of FasL expression. HLA-DRα2 and TIRC7 co-localize at the APC-T cell interaction site. In vivo, triggering the HLA-DR-TIRC7 pathway in lipopolysaccaride (LPS) activated lymphocytes using soluble HLA-DRα2 leads to inhibition of proinflammatory as well as inflammatory cytokines and induction of apoptosis.  These results strongly support the regulatory role of TIRC7 signalling pathway in lymphocytes.

Clinical significance 

TCIRG1 mutations affect the a3 subunit of the vacuolar proton pump, which in turn affects the acidification of the bone-osteoclast interface, resulting in infantile malignant osteopetrosis.

See also 
 T cell
 Co-stimulation
 MHC class II
 CTLA-4
 apoptosis

References

Bibliography 

Journal articles

 
 
 
 
 
 
 
 
 
 
 
 
 
 

Websites

External links